Chrysomyxa succinea is a species of rust fungus in the family Coleosporiaceae which was introduced to Japan where it feeds on Rhododendron dilatatum. The species were recorded from mountains such as Fuji Gotenniwa, Fuji Oniwa and the Yatsugatake Mountains.

References 

Fungal plant pathogens and diseases
Fungi described in 1880
succinea